Dehdari-ye Shurab (also Romanized as Dehdārī-ye Shūrāb; also known as Dehdārī) is a village in Siyakh Darengun Rural District, in the Central District of Shiraz County, Fars Province, Iran. At the 2006 census, its population was 205, in 47 families.

References 

Populated places in Shiraz County